Matri is a mountain of the Garhwal Himalaya in Uttarakhand, India. It is joint 46th highest located entirely within the Uttrakhand. Nanda Devi, is the highest mountain in this category. Matri lies between the Chaturbhuj  and Chirbas Parbat . Its nearest higher neighbor Sri Kailash  lies 10.3 km east. It is located 4.6 km NW of Sudarshan Parbat  and 5.7 km NW lies Kalidhang .

climbing history

Three Indian girls from Paribhraman a team from  Ahmedabad Gujrat climbed Matri (22,047 feet) On June 20, 1963.
An Indian team led by Prajapati Bhodane reached the summit of Matri On September 11, 1991, It was climbed by Prasad and Sher Singh through the southwest ridge. They followed the Matri Glacier from Chirbas.

Glaciers and rivers

Matri Bamak on the southern side from where Matri nala emerges and it joins Bhagirathi river near Chirbas. Bhagirathi the main tributaries of the river Ganga. On the Northern side Gulli gad bamak from there emerges Gulli gad which later joins Jadh Ganga near Neylong. That further joins Bhagirathi river near Bhairion ghati. Bhagirathi later joins Alaknanda River the other main tributaries of the river Ganga at Dev Prayag and became Ganga there after. The word Bamak is used for Glacier and Gad for River.

Neighboring peaks

Neighboring peaks of Matri:

 Chaturbhuj  
 Chirbas Parbat 
 Sudarshan Parbat 
 Kalidhang 
 Yogeshwar:

See also

 List of Himalayan peaks of Uttarakhand

References

Mountains of Uttarakhand
Six-thousanders of the Himalayas
Geography of Chamoli district